Dirk Leppen (born 23 August 1966) is a German former professional tennis player.

Leppen, a native of Vreden, reached a career high singles ranking of 174 in the world and 12th nationally. He featured in the qualifying draw for the 1990 Wimbledon Championships. His ATP Tour main draw appearances include 1990 Italian Open (Rome Masters), where he was beaten in the first round by sixth seed Martín Jaite.

ATP Challenger finals

Doubles: 1 (0–1)

References

External links
 
 

1966 births
Living people
West German male tennis players
German male tennis players
Tennis people from North Rhine-Westphalia